Gerda Renée Blumenthal (1923–2004) was a German-American literary scholar. She taught French and comparative literature at the Catholic University of America from 1968 to 1988.

Life
Gerda Blumenthal was born on July 26, 1923, in Berlin. She escaped Nazi Germany to America around 1941, and studied in New York. She died on April 18, 2004, in Washington, DC.

Works
 The poetic imagination of Georges Bernanos: an essay in interpretation, 1956
 André Malraux: the conquest of dread, 1960
 Thresholds: a study of Proust, 1984

References

1923 births
2004 deaths
Scholars of French literature
German emigrants to the United States
Catholic University of America faculty
American women non-fiction writers
20th-century American women
20th-century American people
American women academics
21st-century American women